Sir Richard Rawlinson Vyvyan, 8th Baronet (6 June 1800 – 15 August 1879) was an English landowner and Tory politician who sat in the House of Commons variously between 1825 and 1857.

Life
Vyvyan was born at Trelowarren, Cornwall, the son of Sir Vyell Vyvyan, 7th Baronet and his wife Mary Hutton Rawlinson, daughter of Thomas Hutton Rawlinson of Lancaster. He was educated at Harrow School and at Christ Church, Oxford but did not take a degree. In 1820, he succeeded to the baronetcy and Vyvyan family estates on the death of his father. He became a lieutenant-colonel commandant in the Cornwall yeomanry cavalry on 5 September 1820.

He left no issue and his successor was Sir Vyell Donnithorne Vyvyan, 9th Baronet (1826–1917)

Political career
In 1825, Vyvyan was elected Member of Parliament for Cornwall. He held the seat until 1831. From 1831 he represented Okehampton, but upon the passage of the Reform Act 1832, he moved to Bristol, serving until 1837. He later served as Member for Helston from 1841 until 1857. Vyvyan was High Sheriff of Cornwall in 1840.

Scientific work
In 1826, Vyvyan was made a Fellow of the Royal Society for his "considerable literary and scientific acquirements especially in the Philosophy of Natural History", previously having been a Fellow of the
Geological Society. He was also the patron of Charles Thomas Pearce, who he initially employed as his secretary in about 1843, and with whom he undertook "researches on light, heat, and magnetism of the Moon's rays" over a period of years. Between 1846 and 1848, they shared a house built by Decimus Burton in London's Regent's Park, called St. Dunstan's Villa.

Evolution

Vyvyan was an advocate of Lamarckian evolution and transmutation of species. He was erroneously suspected of writing Vestiges of the Natural History of Creation until he denied authorship. Historian of science Pietro Corsi has written that Vyvyan "endorsed a quasi-Lamarckian transformation of species, together with phrenology and a broadly evolutionary cosmology."

Scientific writings
An Essay on Arithmo-physiology, privately printed, 1825
Psychology, or a Review of the Arguments in proof of the Existence and Immortality of the Animal Soul, vol. i. 1831; called in immediately after publication
The Harmony of the Comprehensible World (anon.), 1842, 2 vols
The Harmony of the Comprehensible World (anon.), 1845
He also published several letters and speeches. His letter to the magistrates of Berkshire on their practice of 'consigning prisoners to solitary confinement before trial, and ordering them to be disguised by masks,' passed into a second edition in 1845. His account of the fogou or cave at Halligey, Trelowarren, is in the Journal of the Royal Institution of Cornwall (1885, viii. 256–8).

References

Further reading

M. Coate. (1950). The Vyvyan Family of Trelowarren. Transactions of the Royal Historical Society 32: 111–119.

External links

Family genealogy
Trelowarren web site
Trelowarren garden description

 

1800 births
1879 deaths
Baronets in the Baronetage of England
Conservative Party (UK) MPs for English constituencies
Ultra-Tory MPs
Politicians from Cornwall
UK MPs 1826–1830
UK MPs 1830–1831
UK MPs 1831–1832
UK MPs 1832–1835
UK MPs 1835–1837
UK MPs 1841–1847
UK MPs 1847–1852
UK MPs 1852–1857
People educated at Harrow School
Alumni of Christ Church, Oxford
Fellows of the Royal Society
Fellows of the Geological Society of London
High Sheriffs of Cornwall
English landowners
Burials in Cornwall
Lizard Peninsula
Proto-evolutionary biologists
Members of the Parliament of the United Kingdom for Okehampton
Members of the Parliament of the United Kingdom for Cornwall
Members of the Parliament of the United Kingdom for Bristol
Members of the Parliament of the United Kingdom for Helston
19th-century British businesspeople